

Medalists

Standings
Men's Competition

References
Complete 1983 Mediterranean Games Standings Archived

1983 in water polo
Sports at the 1983 Mediterranean Games
1983
1983